Pirmin Stekeler-Weithofer (born 21 December 1952 in Meßkirch) is a German philosopher and professor of theoretical philosophy at the university of Leipzig. He was the president of the international Ludwig Wittgenstein society (2006-2009) and is now a vice-president of this institution.

Philosophy 

The philosopher studied mathematics and philosophy in Berkeley, Konstanz, Berlin, Prague and teaches theoretical philosophy at the university of Leipzig.

Stekeler-Weithofer contributes to the philosophy of language, action theory, logic and the relationships between classical and analytical philosophy. An important point is the philosophy of Hegel.

References

Books 
 Grundprobleme der Logik. Elemente einer Kritik der formalen Vernunft. Berlin 1986, .
 Hegels Analytische Philosophie. Die Wissenschaft der Logik als kritische Theorie der Bedeutung. Paderborn 1992, .
 Sinn-Kriterien. Die logischen Grundlagen kritischer Philosophie von Platon bis Wittgenstein. Paderborn 1995, .
 Was heißt Denken? Von Heidegger über Hölderlin zu Derrida. Bonn University Press, Bonn 2004, .
 Philosophie des Selbstbewußtseins. Hegels System als Formanalyse von Wissen und Autonomie. Suhrkamp (stw 1749), Frankfurt/M. 2005, .
 (together with Friedrich Kambartel) Sprachphilosophie. Probleme und Methoden. Reclam, Stuttgart 2005, .
Philosophiegeschichte. de Gruyter 2006, 
Formen der Anschauung. Eine Philosophie der Mathematik. de Gruyter 2008, .
Sinn (Grundthemen Philosophie) de Gruyter, Berlin/Boston 2011, .
Denkströme. Journal der Sächsischen Akademie der Wissenschaften. Im Auftrag der Sächsischen Akademie der Wissenschaften zu Leipzig herausgegeben von Pirmin Stekeler-Weithofer. Leipziger Universitätsverlag, ISSN (Druck): 1867–6413; ISSN (Online): 1867–7061, Onlineausgabe: www.denkstroeme.de.
Denken. Wege und Abwege in der Philosophie des Geistes (Philosophische Untersuchungen 28), Mohr Siebeck, Tübingen 2012, .
Hegels Phänomenologie des Geistes. Ein dialogischer Kommentar: Band 1: Gewissheit und Vernunft. Band 2: Geist und Religion, Meiner, Hamburg 2014, 
 Manuscript Hegel's Analytic Pragmatism

External links 
Homepage on University of Leipzig 
 „Die Wahrheit des Bewusstseins ist das Selbstbewusstsein.“ Hegels Weg zur konkreten Selbstbestimmung in der Enzyklopädie. (pdf) (227 kB, German)

1952 births
Living people
People from Meßkirch
20th-century German philosophers
21st-century German philosophers
Continental philosophers
Hegelian philosophers
Wittgensteinian philosophers